Coalville Town was a railway station at Coalville in Leicestershire on the Leicester to Burton upon Trent Line. Passenger business was carried out at the "Railway Hotel" when the line opened in 1833 until the first Coalville station was opened by the Midland Railway in 1848, replaced in 1894 and closed in 1964, although the line remains in use for freight.

History

The Leicester and Swannington Railway was originally built to carry coal and there was little provision for any passenger traffic. When the railway opened at Long Lane, now Coalville, in 1833 passenger business had to be carried out at the "Railway Hotel" adjacent to the level crossing. The first proper Coalville station was opened in 1848 after the line had been taken over by the Midland Railway. British Railways closed Coalville Town on 7 September 1964 when passenger services were ended on the line. The line remains open for freight only. Coalville Town was the most important station between Leicester and Burton-on-Trent and was built to fuller dimensions to reflect this.

The station was to the north of the A50 road beside the level crossing, which was controlled by a signal box that was removed in 1986 and re-erected at the former Snibston Colliery. All the other station buildings have been demolished. The former Railway pub next to the level crossing is now a children's nursery.

Stationmasters

William Spriggs until 1861
R. Caton 1861 - 1864
Francis Jowett 1864 - 1877
Robert Bunting 1877 - ca. 1885
George Tomblin 1887 - 1909
Henry Lewis 1909 - 1917 (afterwards station master and district cashier at Swansea)
Thomas Maidens 1918 - 1921
Walter Bennett 1921 - 1939
Walter Lea 1939 - 1941
R.W. Masters from 1941 - 1948 (afterwards station master at Macclesfield)
H. Humphreys 1948 - 1953 (formerly station master at Bedworth)

Motive power depot

British Railways closed Mantle Lane motive power depot at Coalville in 1990. Its "Category A" status was a clerical error, and it should have been  "Category C". The British Railways depot on the site was unusual in that it had no fuelling points, fitters or any other shed facilities. This perhaps shows why it was a surprise to find it as an A-listed depot. Little remains at the site which hints at its formerly busy railway past. Two tracks remain where once lay four 'on shed' as it were.

Reopening proposals
In the 1990s BR planned to restore passenger services between Leicester and Burton as the second phase of its Ivanhoe Line project. However, after the privatisation of British Rail in 1995 this phase of the project was discontinued. In 2009 the Association of Train Operating Companies published a £49 million proposal to restore passenger services to the line that would include reopening a station at Coalville.

References

Disused railway stations in Leicestershire
Former Midland Railway stations
Railway stations in Great Britain opened in 1833
Railway stations in Great Britain closed in 1964
Beeching closures in England
Proposed railway stations in England
Coalville